The Seekriegsleitung or SKL (Maritime Warfare Command) was a higher command staff section of the Kaiserliche Marine and the Kriegsmarine of Germany during the World Wars.

World War I
The SKL was established on August 27, 1918, on the initiative of Admiral Reinhard Scheer, who became its first commander, simultaneously to being the Chief of the German Imperial Admiralty Staff. It led the planning and execution of naval combat and directed the distribution of naval forces. Up to this point, that was done by several staffs and the individual theater commanders; including the Supreme Army Command under General Erich Ludendorff, whose decisions led to the unrestricted submarine warfare and the entrance of the United States into the war. When the war ended, the SKL was absorbed into the admiralty.

World War II
The SKL was reestablished in 1937 and deeply linked in the Naval High Command, the Commander-in-Chief also being the commander of the SKL with the Commander of the Naval Command Department (Marinekommandoamt) as the Chief of Staff. Though the competences of the SKL initially were equal to their role in World War I, they were narrowed when the Naval Command Department was split from it. The command was limited to except-domestic sea-areas, where the naval group commands did not possess the operational guidance. Also, the submarine war split and were, under the Commander of the submarines (Befehlshaber der U-Boote), directly subordinate to the Commander-in-Chief. In 1944, the SKL was tasked with the command of fleet units operating as transports, blockade runners, auxiliary cruisers and supply shipping.

SKL command
The Commanders of the Seekriegsleitung were:

The Chiefs of Staff of the Seekriegsleitung were:

References

Erich Gröner - Die Schiffe der deutschen Kriegsmarine und ihr Verbleib 1939-1945, J.F. Lehmanns Verlag, München (1976)
Hans H. Hildebrand - Die organisatorische Entwicklung der Marine nebst Stellenbesetzung 1848 bis 1945, Biblio-Verlag, Osnabrück(2000)
Hans H. Hildebrand & Ernest Henriot –Deutschlands Admirale 1849-1945, Biblio Verlag, Osnabrück (1989)
Hans H. Hildebrand, Albert Röhr & Hans-Otto Steinmetz – Die Deutschen Kriegsschiffe, Koehlers Verlagsgesellschaft mbH, Hamburg (1980)
Walter Lohmann & Hans H. Hildebrand –Die Deutsche Kriegsmarine, Verlag Hans-Henning Podzun, Bad Nauheim (1956)

Imperial German Navy
Naval history of Germany
Kriegsmarine
Naval units and formations of Germany